Richard of Gravesend (or Richard de Gravesend; died 18 December 1279) was a medieval Bishop of Lincoln.

Life

Richard was a native of Gravesend in Kent. He was a treasurer of the diocese of Hereford around 1238. By 16 June 1250 he was Archdeacon of Oxford in the diocese of Lincoln. Before August 1254, he was holding the office of Dean of Lincoln.

Richard was elected to the see of Lincoln on 21 or 23 September 1258 and consecrated on 3 November 1258 at Canterbury. He supported Simon de Montfort and was suspended from office and in exile from 1265 to 1267.

Richard died on 18 December 1279 at Stow Park.

Richard was the uncle of Richard of Gravesend, who was Archdeacon of Northampton.

Citations

References

 
 
 
 
 

Bishops of Lincoln
Archdeacons of Oxford
1279 deaths
13th-century English Roman Catholic bishops
People from Gravesend, Kent
Deans of Lincoln
Year of birth unknown